Federal elections were held in Switzerland on 26 October 1851. The Radical Left remained the largest group in the National Council, winning 78 of the 120 seats.

Electoral system
The elections were held under the Federal law concerning the elections to the National Council, which had been passed on 21 December 1850. The 120 members of the National Council were elected in 49 single- and multi-member constituencies; there was one seat for every 20,000 citizens, with seats allocated to cantons in proportion to their population. The 1850 law reduced the number of constituencies from 52, but increased the number of seats from 111; Aargau, Glarus, Lucerne, Neuchâtel, Vaud and Zürich gained one seat each, whilst Bern gained three seats. The law also set the election date as the last Sunday in October and introduced a three-year term.

The elections were held using a three-round system; candidates had to receive a majority in the first or second round to be elected; if it went to a third round, only a plurality was required. Voters could cast as many votes as there were seats in their constituency. In six cantons (Appenzell Innerrhoden, Appenzell Ausserrhoden, Glarus, Nidwalden, Obwalden and Uri), National Council members were elected by the Landsgemeinde.

Results

National Council

By constituency

Council of States

References

Federal elections in Switzerland
Switzerland
Federal
Switzerland